Paul E. Lefebvre is a retired Marine Corps Major General and was the third Commanding General of the Marine Corps Forces Special Operations Command (MARSOC).

Early life and education
Lefebvre graduated from Springfield College in 1975 with a Bachelor of Science in Physical Education.

Prior to entering the Marine Corps, he coached football at Pennsylvania State University under the tutelage of the legendary Joe Paterno.

He also is an honor graduate of Officer Candidate School, The Basic School and Amphibious Warfare School and a distinguished graduate of Marine Command and Staff College and the Marine Corps War College.

Military career
In April 1977 Lefebvre was commissioned a second lieutenant after graduating from Officer Candidate School. Before assignment to the Fleet Marine Force, he graduated from The Basic School and Infantry Officers Course. Initially assigned to 1st Battalion, 3rd Marines, he commanded a rifle platoon, weapons platoon, and a 81mm mortar platoon.

In 1981, he served as a Guard Company commander of the Marine Barracks at Naval Weapons Station Earle.

In 1985, Lefebvre was assigned to 2nd Battalion 9th Marines, where he commanded the Headquarters & Support Company and the Weapons Company, as well as operations officer.

He served as an instructor at the Amphibious Warfare School from 1988 until 1992, when he transferred to the Joint Special Operations Command at Fort Bragg serving as current operations officer till 1995. In 1995, he served as the executive officer of the 8th Marine Regiment, then assumed command of 3rd Battalion 8th Marines.

After a short period as the executive officer of the 2nd Marine Regiment in 1998, he transferred to Headquarters Marine Corps to direct the Strategic Initiatives Group and the Commandant's "War Room".

He assumed command of the 22nd Marine Expeditionary Unit in 2000, and in the wake of the September 11 attacks, lead the unit into Afghanistan.

In 2003, Lefebvre directed the MAGTF Staff Training Program at Marine Corps Combat Development Command until 2004, when served as the Deputy Director of Operations at United States Pacific Command until 2006.

He then commanded Marine Corps Recruit Depot Parris Island and Eastern Recruiting Region for two years. In 2008, he became the Deputy Commanding General of Multi-National Corps Iraq, and then briefly the Deputy Commanding General of II Marine Expeditionary Force in 2009.

In November 2009, Major General Mastin M. Robeson turned over command of MARSOC to Lefebvre. He was retired from the Marine Corps in 2012.  He also served on the board of governors for the Marine Corps Association and the editorial board for the Marine Corps Gazette. He is an honorary chairman of The OSS Society.

Awards and honors
Lefebvre's awards include: 
 

In 1987, while serving with 2nd Battalion 9th Marines, Lefebvre was awarded the Leftwich Trophy.

References

Biography from the Marine Corps website
Biography from MARSOC website

Year of birth missing (living people)
Living people
Marine Corps War College alumni
United States Marine Corps personnel of the Iraq War
United States Marine Corps generals
Springfield Pride football players
Penn State Nittany Lions football coaches
Recipients of the Legion of Merit
Recipients of the Defense Superior Service Medal
Recipients of the Leftwich Trophy